Envenom is the eighth album by Runemagick. It was released as a limited edition of 1,000 hand-numbered digipaks only in 2005 through Aftermath Music.

Track listing
"Vultures" – 12:17
"Envenom (Laterna Magica)" – 14:51
"Nebulous" – 8:23
"Omnivore (Sin Eater)" – 11:22
"Maelstrom" – 14:22

Credits
 Nicklas "Terror" Rudolfsson - Vocals, Guitar
 Emma Karlsson - Bass
 Daniel Moilanen - Drums

Runemagick albums
2005 albums